The Mahanadi River is a major river in East Central India. It is the longest earthen dam in the world. Mahanadi is also known for the Hirakud Dam which was the first major multipurpose river valley project after India's independence in 1947. The river flows through the states of Chhattisgarh and Odisha and before finally ending in the Bay of Bengal.

Etymology 
The word Mahanadi is a compound of the Sanskrit words maha ("great") and nadi ("river").

In different era, this river was known by several names, such as:
Ancient era – Kanaknandini
Dvapara Yuga – Chitrotpala (Similar name in Matsya Purana)
Treta Yuga – Nilotpala (Similar name in vayu Purana)
Mahabharata era – Mahanad
Kali Yuga – Mahanadi or Mahashweta

Course

Source and Upper Course 
Like many other seasonal Indian rivers, the Mahanadi too is a combination of many mountain streams and thus its precise source is impossible to pinpoint. The hills here are an extension of the Eastern Ghats and are a source of many other streams which then go on to join the Mahanadi.

For the first  of its course, the Mahanadi flows in a northerly direction and drains the Raipur district and touches eastern portions of Raipur city. It is a rather narrow river at this stage and the total width of its valley does not exceed 500–600 metres.

Middle course 
After being joined by the Shivnath, the river flows in an easterly direction through the remaining part of its journey. It is joined by the Jonk and Hasdeo rivers here before entering into Odisha after covering about half of its total length. Near the city of Sambalpur, it is dammed by the longest earthen dam in the world, the Hirakud Dam. A composite structure of the earth, concrete and masonry, the dam measures  including the Dykes. It spans two hills; the Lamdungri on the left and the Chandili Dunguri on the right.

After the formation of Chhattisgarh State, the major portion of Mahanadi basin now lies in Chhattisgarh. Presently, only  basin area of Hasdeo River in Anuppur District lies in Madhya Pradesh.

Before the construction of the dam in 1953, the Mahanadi was about a mile wide at Sambalpur and carried massive amounts of silt, especially during the monsoon. Today, it is a rather tame river after the construction of the dam and is joined by the Ib, Ong, Tel and other minor streams. It then skirts the boundaries of the Baudh district and forces a tortuous way between ridges and ledges in a series of rapids until it reaches Dholpur, Odisha. The Satakosia Gorge ends at Badamul of Nayagarh. Dense forests cover the hills flanking the river here. A barrage has been constructed here to regulate the river's flow into Cuttack.

Lower Course 

The river traverses Cuttack district in an east–west direction. Just before entering Cuttack, it gives off a large distributary called the Kathjori. The city of Cuttack stands on the spit separating the two channels. The Kathjori then throws off many streams like the Kuakhai, Devi and Surua which fall into the Bay of Bengal after entering Puri district. The Kathjori itself falls into the sea as the Jotdar. Other distributaries of Mahanadi include the Paika, Birupa, Chitroptala river, Genguti and Lun.The Birupa then goes on to join the Brahmani River at Krushnanagar and enters the Bay of Bengal at Dhamra. The Mahanadi proper enters the sea via several channels near Paradeep at False Point, Jagatsinghpur. The combined Delta of the Mahanadi's numerous distributaries and the Brahmani is one of the largest in India.

Navigation 
However numerous barrages apart from the Hirakud have put an end to that. Today, boats are restricted to the delta region and the Hirakud reservoir. Fresh water crocodiles, Ganges and Bull sharks frequent Mahanadi.

Trade and agriculture 
The Mahanadi is an important river in the state of Odisha.

The cities of Cuttack and Sambalpur were prominent trading places in the ancient world and the river itself has been referred to as the Manada in Ptolemy's works. However today the Mahanadi valley is best known for its fertile soil and flourishing agriculture.

Water 

Average annual surface water potential of 66.9 km³ has been assessed in this basin. Out of this, 50.0 km³ is usable water.

Present use of surface water in the basin is 17.0 km³. Live storage capacity in the basin has increased significantly since independence. From just about 0.8 km³ in the pre-plan period, the total live storage capacity of the completed projects has increased to 8.5 km³. In addition, a substantial storage quantity of over 5.4 km³ would be created on completion of projects under construction. Additional storage to the tune of over 11.0 km³ would become available on execution of projects under consideration. The hydropower potential of the basin has been assessed as 627 MW at 60% load factor.

However owing to its seasonal nature the river is mostly a narrow channel flanked by wide sand banks for most of the year.

Floods 

The Mahanadi was notorious for its devastating floods for much of recorded history. Thus it was called 'the sorrow of Orissa'. However the construction of the Hirakud Dam has greatly altered the situation. Today a network of canals, barrages and check dams keep the river well in control. However heavy rain can still cause large scale flooding as evidenced in September, 2008 when 16 people died as the river breached its banks.

In 2011, September heavy down pour of rain caused flash flood and many mud dwellings in more than 25 villages above Hirakud Dam which were never affected before, both in Chhattisgarh and Odisha, have melted down due to back water that could not pass through the river.

References

Further reading 
 The Imperial Gazetteer of India-William Hunter, 1901
 The Encyclopædia Britannica-1911 Ed.
 The Columbus Encyclopedia
the river in central India the 1994 Tamil film Mahanadi (film)

External links 

 Rivers Network – Mahanadi river watersheds webmap
 
 Mahanadi River
 Kayaking on River Mahanadi

 
Rivers of Odisha
Rivers of Chhattisgarh
Rivers of India
Rivers in Buddhism